Fox Island is one of the Falkland Islands. It is near West Falkland, to its west, near Spring Point and Dunnose Head in Queen Charlotte Bay.

References

Islands of the Falkland Islands